Group B of the 2013 Fed Cup Americas Zone Group I was one of four pools in the Americas zone of the 2013 Fed Cup. Four teams competed in a round robin competition, with the top team and the bottom two teams proceeding to their respective sections of the play-offs: the top teams played for advancement to the World Group II Play-offs, while the bottom teams faced potential relegation to Group II.

Standings

Round-robin

Paraguay vs. Mexico

Brazil vs. Chile

Paraguay vs. Chile

Brazil vs. Mexico

Paraguay vs. Brazil

Chile vs. Mexico

References

External links 
 Fed Cup website

2013 Fed Cup Americas Zone